Adolf Erik Ehrnrooth (9 February 1905 – 26 February 2004) was a Finnish general who served during the Winter and Continuation wars. He also competed in two equestrian events at the 1948 Summer Olympics.

Early life
Born in Helsinki, Ehrnrooth first went to Svenska normallyceum i Helsingfors and then entered cadet school in 1922 and served in the Uusimaa Dragoon Regiment (Uudenmaan Rakuunarykmentti). In 1958 he married a Danish countess Karin-Birgitte Schack who was a lady-in-waiting and a close friend of Queen Ingrid of Denmark. They had three children: Karin, Hans and Eva.

Military career
During the brief Winter War against the Soviet Union, he served on the staffs of the 7th Division and the Cavalry Brigade. When the Continuation War, also against the Soviet Union, broke out in June 1941, he served as the chief of staff of the 2nd Division until he was seriously wounded. After he recovered he was appointed to lead the 7th Infantry regiment (JR 7) of the 2nd Division. During the battles on the Karelian Isthmus, he was awarded the Mannerheim cross. He also received the Grand Cross of the Royal Swedish Order of the Sword.

After the war, he led an active military career until he retired in 1965.

Later life
Adolf Ehrnrooth was the face and voice most associated with rehabilitation of the soldiers who secured Finland her independence. The long post-war era during which it simply was not progressive to value the military ended in the early 1990s, at which time his charismatic persona was at its height.

Voice impressionists have found his idiosyncratically emphasized speech patterns and overheavily guttural snarls a rich ground to harvest. For them he is one of the indispensable voices.

In his last statement he gave support to ProKarelia (Finnish NGO) and its plan for the Return of Ceded Territories. He said that he defended the borders of Finland declared in the Treaty of Tartu and considered them the only proper borders of Finland and that it was great injustice that the Soviet Union had taken these territories.

General Ehrnrooth died on 26 February 2004, and is buried in Hietaniemi cemetery, Helsinki.  He was voted as the 4th greatest Finn of all time by the Finnish public during the Suuret suomalaiset (Great Finns) competition in 2004.

See also
 Carl Gustaf Emil Mannerheim
 Finnish Defence Force
 Winter War

References

Bibliography 
 Karin Ehrnrooth: Isäni oli nuori sotilas / Min fader var en ung soldat – Adolf Ehrnrooth, Ajatus Kirjat 2008, 
 Adolf Ehrnrooth − Marja-Liisa Lehtonen: Kenraalin testamentti, WSOY 1995.
 Ulla Appelsin: Adolf Ehrnrooth, Kenraalin vuosisata, Ajatus Kirjat 2001.

External links 

 

1905 births
2004 deaths
Military personnel from Helsinki
Swedish-speaking Finns
Finnish military personnel of World War II
Finnish generals
Knights of the Mannerheim Cross
Continuation War
Recipients of the Order of the Cross of Terra Mariana, 1st Class
Finnish male equestrians
Olympic equestrians of Finland
Equestrians at the 1948 Summer Olympics
Adolf